Meilinqiao Town is an urban town in Xiangtan County, Xiangtan City, Hunan Province, People's Republic of China.  it had a population of 49385 and an area of .

History
In 1950, Meilin Township was built. In 1995, Meilin Town was built.

Administrative division
The town is divided into 38 villages, the following areas: Hejia Village, Wanli Village, Lianyun Village, Anyun Village, Qianjiang Village, Zhushan Village, Jinpenzhou Village, Shibi Village, Meishi Village, Shimei Village, Huangzhu Village, Jingguang Village, Meilin Village, Gutangpu Village, Hongtang Village, Gaoqiao Village, Gufeng Village, Dafen Village, Yuexing Village, Baota Village, Shiyang Village, Jiangang Village, Baiyun Village, Feilong Village, Huaxiang Village, Xinhu Village, Xinhu Village, Xinti Village, Xinchang Village, Huanglongqiao Village, Renhe Village, Helong Village, Chengtang Village, Wangjiachong Village, Yangliu Village, Futang Village, Zhegu Village, and Guojiaqiao Village.

Geography
Yisu River is known as "Juan River"(), a tributary of the Xiang River, it flows through the town, Meilin River and Xiangdong River also flow through the town.

Economy
The region abounds with gypsum.

Tea, pig, American bullfrog, common fig and cactus are important to the economy.

Culture
Huaguxi is the most influence local theater.

Transportation
The major highways are the 107 National Road and the Xianglei Highway.

The main railway is the Xiangqin Railway.

References

Divisions of Xiangtan County
Historic township-level divisions of Xiangtan